The 2004–05 NBA season was the 29th season for the Denver Nuggets in the National Basketball Association, and their 38th season as a franchise. During the offseason, the Nuggets acquired Kenyon Martin from the New Jersey Nets. Coming off their first playoff appearance in nine years, the Nuggets got off to a shaky start at 13–15. Head coach Jeff Bzdelik was fired and replaced with Michael Cooper as the team lost 10 of their next 14 games. Cooper was then replaced with George Karl, who then led the Nuggets with a 32–8 record for the remainder of the season, including a ten-game winning streak in April. The Nuggets finished second in the Northwest Division with a 49–33 record. Second-year star Carmelo Anthony led them in scoring with 20.8 points per game.

Entering the playoffs as the #7 seed in the Western Conference, the Nuggets won Game 1 over the 2nd-seeded San Antonio Spurs, but would lose the series in five games. The Spurs then defeated the Detroit Pistons in seven games in the NBA Finals, winning their third championship in franchise history.

Draft picks

Roster

Regular season

Season standings

Record vs. opponents

Game log

Playoffs

|- align="center" bgcolor="#ccffcc"
| 1
| April 24
| @ San Antonio
| W 93–87
| Andre Miller (31)
| Marcus Camby (12)
| Andre Miller (5)
| SBC Center18,797
| 1–0
|- align="center" bgcolor="#ffcccc"
| 2
| April 27
| @ San Antonio
| L 76–104
| DeMarr Johnson (12)
| Marcus Camby (12)
| Andre Miller (7)
| SBC Center18,797
| 1–1
|- align="center" bgcolor="#ffcccc"
| 3
| April 30
| San Antonio
| L 78–86
| Carmelo Anthony (19)
| Marcus Camby (14)
| Andre Miller (7)
| Pepsi Center19,913
| 1–2
|- align="center" bgcolor="#ffcccc"
| 4
| May 2
| San Antonio
| L 115–126 (OT)
| Earl Boykins (32)
| Marcus Camby (14)
| Anthony, Boykins (5)
| Pepsi Center19,776
| 1–3
|- align="center" bgcolor="#ffcccc"
| 5
| May 4
| @ San Antonio
| L 89–99
| Carmelo Anthony (25)
| Marcus Camby (10)
| Andre Miller (6)
| SBC Center18,797
| 1–4
|-

Player statistics

Regular season

Playoffs

Player Statistics Citation:

Awards and records
 Marcus Camby, NBA All-Defensive Second Team

Transactions

References

Denver Nuggets seasons
Den
Denver Nuggets
Denver Nuggets